Ocotlán is a city and municipality in Jalisco, Mexico. Its industry includes furniture production. Is the seat of the Región Ciénega.

Etymology
Ocotlán means "near the pines" or "place of the ocote (pines)". Ocote is from Nahuatl ocōtl, Pinus montezumae, a species of pine.

History
Ocotlán was founded in 1530.  Two main cathedrals line the plaza. One is the church named La Purisima ("The Most Pure"), which is one of the oldest buildings in Jalisco. The altar is dipped in gold. The other cathedral, more recent than La Purisima, was built in the late 1800s and dedicated to Nuestro Señor de Misericordia (Our Merciful Lord), which honors a vision of Christ seen after an extremely destructive earthquake.

The current municipal president is Lic. Josué Avila, from the MORENA party in Mexico.

Appearance of Christ
On October 2, 1847 at  approximately 0730, a large and powerful earthquake destroyed most of the city, including the original church. The following day, a Sunday, when the faithful were attending a Mass outside of the destroyed church, a vision of the crucifix was claimed to have been seen. It is said that they saw the vision of Christ, which is why the people of Ocotlán celebrate this day with high regards. It is a recognized event, not to be forgotten. It has become a tradition passed from generation to generation, with celebrations taking place in Ocotlán, and in different parts of the United States by those who have migrated from Ocotlán.

Geography
Ocotlán borders Poncitlán and Tototlán and is only 50 minutes drive east-southeast from the city of Guadalajara. It is on the northeast end of Lake Chapala, Mexico's largest lake. As of 2010, the city had a population of 92,967. The municipality of Ocotlán, which has an area of 247.7 km² (95.64 sq mi), had a population of 89,340. The proper gentilic for the inhabitants is Ocotlense. The altitude of the city is 5020 ft, and the time zone is UTC-6.

Businesses
Some of the businesses in Ocotlán are Nestlé, Celanese, Forrajes El Nogal, Maderas primas de occidente, Triplay y Aglomerados, Fábrica de Muebles La Cibeles and many other furniture factories, like EMMAN, an MDF manufacturer. Celanese closed its acetate flake plant, built in 1947, on 31 October 2019, eliminating 200 jobs.

Architecture
One of the most important buildings is the new library and media center, recently opened to the public in 2000, and operated by the University of Guadalajara. The modern building is inspired by the lineal constructions of the university center. It features an impressive lobby of multiple heights in which the main elements of the visual composition of the space are the books themselves. The building was designed by the young architecture firm LeAP, based in Guadalajara. It has been published and exhibited locally and internationally.

Notable people
 Carlos Salcido  (footballer)
 Miguel Basulto  (footballer)
 Jonny Magallón (footballer)
 Ismael Íñiguez (footballer)
 Flavio Santos (footballer)
 Oscar Macías (footballer)
 Alejandra Muñoz ( Entrepreneur)

Sister cities
 Corona, United States
 Olathe, United States
 Oxnard, United States
 Stone Park, United States

References

Jalisco Enciclopedia de los Municipios de México

External links
 Ocotlán Ciudad del Mueble Official website www.ocotlanciudaddelmueble.net
 Ocotlán Sitio de la Comunidad Official website www.ocotlanjalisco.net
 Ocotlán Municipal Government Official website
 Map of Ocotlán and surrounding areas

Municipalities of Jalisco
Populated places established in 1530